Sheyla Gutiérrez Ruiz (born 1 January 1994) is a Spanish racing cyclist, who rides for UCI Women's WorldTeam . She rode at the 2014 UCI Road World Championships. In November 2015 she was announced as part of the inaugural squad for the  team for the 2016 season.

Major results
Source: 

2011
 6th Road race, UCI Junior Road World Championships
2012
 5th Iurreta
 7th Road race, UCI Junior Road World Championships
 7th Trofeo Roldan
2013
 1st Zalla
 2nd Sopelana
 2nd Clasica de la Montaña Palentina
 2nd Iurreta
 2nd Balmaseda
 3rd Tolosa
 4th Villabona-Zizurkil
 4th Ozaeta
 National Road Championships
5th Road race
9th Time trial
 5th Tafalla (Campeonato de Navarra)
 6th Trofeo Gobierno de La Rioja
 9th Gran Premio Txori-Erri
2014
 1st Villarcayo
 2nd Trofeu Fira d'Agost Xativa
 2nd Trofeo Zamora
 2nd Zalla
 3rd Road race, National Road Championships
 3rd Trofeo Gobierno de La Rioja
 6th Tafalla
 6th Sopelana
 7th Grand Prix de Plumelec-Morbihan Dames
 7th Balmaseda
2015
 1st Grand Prix de Plumelec-Morbihan Dames
 2nd Time trial, National Road Championships
 2nd Iurreta
 3rd Sopelana
 3rd Trofeo Zamora
 6th Omloop van het Hageland
 6th La Classique Morbihan
 6th Zalla
 7th Acht van Chaam
 7th Cholet Pays de Loire Dames
 9th Time trial, UEC European Under-23 Road Championships
 10th Overall Tour de Feminin-O cenu Českého Švýcarska
 10th La Madrid Challenge by La Vuelta
2016
 National Road Championships
3rd Road race
4th Time trial
 4th Grand Prix de Dottignies
 8th Road race, UCI Road World Championships
2017
 National Road Championships
1st  Road race
3rd Time trial
 1st Le Samyn des Dames
 1st Stage 7 Giro d'Italia Femminile
 3rd Trofeo Gobierno de La Rioja
 5th Madrid Challenge by La Vuelta
 6th Gran Premio Bruno Beghelli Internazionale Donne Elite
 6th GP de Plouay – Bretagne
 7th Women's Tour de Yorkshire
 7th Grand Prix de Dottignies
 8th Omloop Het Nieuwsblad
 9th Giro dell'Emilia Internazionale Donne Elite
 9th Drentse Acht van Westerveld
 10th Pajot Hills Classic
 10th Gent–Wevelgem
2018
 1st  Overall Tour of Zhoushan Island
1st  Points classification
 1st  Overall Panorama Guizhou International Women's Road Cycling Race
1st Stage 1
 6th Le Samyn des Dames
 7th Driedaagse Brugge–De Panne
2019
 1st  Time trial, National Road Championships
 3rd Grand Prix de Plumelec-Morbihan Dames
 5th Dwars door Vlaanderen for Women
 7th Gran Premio Bruno Beghelli Internazionale Donne Elite
2020
 1st La Périgord Ladies
 3rd Time trial, National Road Championships
 6th Clasica Femenina Navarra
2022
 Tour Cycliste Féminin International de l'Ardèche
1st Stages 1 & 2
 2nd Time trial, National Road Championships
 7th Kreiz Breizh Elites Dames

References

External links

1994 births
Living people
Spanish female cyclists
Sportspeople from Logroño
Cyclists at the 2015 European Games
European Games competitors for Spain
Competitors at the 2018 Mediterranean Games
Mediterranean Games competitors for Spain
Cyclists from La Rioja (Spain)
21st-century Spanish women